Kyrkjebø Church is a parish church of the Church of Norway in Høyanger Municipality in Vestland county, Norway. It is located in the village of Kyrkjebø. It is the church for the Kyrkjebø parish which is part of the Sunnfjord prosti (deanery) in the Diocese of Bjørgvin. The wooden church was built in a long church design in 1869 using plans drawn up by the architect Christian Christie, who based his designs on the old stave churches in Norway. The church is a three-nave basilica church which seats about 500 people.

Design
The Kyrkjebø Church's architecture is based on the classical lines and derives from Gothic cathedral designs. This design was as much the result of architectural choice as of the technical requirements for building churches that emerged during the 19th century. The improvement in technology and crafting techniques at the turn of the century had led to churches adopting a lighter form and employing elaborate detailing.

History
The earliest existing historical records of the church date back to the year 1331, but it was not new that year. The church had been known as Austreim Church (Østreim kirke), but some time after the move, it became known by its new location, Kirkebø kirke. In 1670, the church was enlarged to the north side by adding a transept to create a partial cruciform design. The  choir was located east of the nave. There was a small church porch with a tower on the west end of the nave.

The building was designed by Christian Christie and the lead builder was John Alver. The church was inspired by the historic stave churches in Norway. The new church was consecrated on 7 October 1869. After the new church was completed, the old church was torn down. In 1920, a new roof was installed. In 1957, the church was renovated to better insulate the building. New wall panelling, new ceiling, and new floors were all installed. In 1966, the church was wired for electricity. In 1967, the tower was significantly repaired. In 1986–1987, a small extension on the north side was torn down and replaced with a larger one that houses a bathroom and other storage rooms.

See also
List of churches in Bjørgvin

References

Høyanger
Churches in Vestland
Long churches in Norway
Wooden churches in Norway
19th-century Church of Norway church buildings
Churches completed in 1869
12th-century establishments in Norway